"Whole Lotta Gone" is a song recorded by American country music artist Joe Diffie.  It was released in June 1996 as the third single from the album Life's So Funny.  The song reached #23 on the Billboard Hot Country Singles & Tracks chart.  The song was written by Keith Burns and Mark James Oliverius.

Chart performance

References

1996 singles
1996 songs
Joe Diffie songs
Epic Records singles